Leonel Bucca (born 20 March 1999) is an Argentine professional footballer who plays as a midfielder for Unión Santa Fe.

Career
Bucca initially came through the ranks at local side San Lorenzo Esperanza, before moving into the Unión Santa Fe youth system in 2016. In January 2020, Bucca was linked with a move to the United States with second tier team Loudoun United. The move never materialised, with the midfielder later describing it as "nothing concrete". He signed his first professional contract on 28 October 2020, which was followed by his senior debut in a draw at home to Arsenal de Sarandí on 1 November; he featured for seventy-five minutes. He was sent off in his second appearance on 20 November against the same opponents.

After five total matches for Unión, Bucca was loaned to Primera B Nacional with Deportivo Riestra on 10 February 2021.

Personal life
On 22 November 2020, it was confirmed that Bucca had tested positive for COVID-19 amid the pandemic.

Career statistics
.

Notes

References

External links

1999 births
Living people
People from Esperanza, Santa Fe
Argentine footballers
Association football midfielders
Argentine Primera División players
Unión de Santa Fe footballers
Deportivo Riestra players
Sportspeople from Santa Fe Province